The Tamayo Fault is a major right lateral-moving transform fault located on the seabed at the mouth of the Gulf of California.  The fault is the southernmost transform in the Gulf of California Rift Zone.  The fault links the Rivera Ridge segment of the East Pacific Rise in the south with the Alarcon Basin in the north.

References
 The Tamayo transform fault in the mouth of the Gulf of California, Kastens et al (1979)
 Tectonics at the Intersection of the East Pacific Rise with Tamayo Transform Fault, Gallo et al (1983)

Geology of Mexico
Strike-slip faults
Gulf of California
Seismic faults of Mexico